Komila is an administrative unit, known as union council of Kohistan District in the Khyber Pakhtunkhwa province of Pakistan.

District Upper Kohistan has four tehsils namely Dassu, Kandia, Bhasha and Seo. Each Tehsil comprises a certain number of Union councils. There are 17 Union councils in district Upper Kohistan. Komila is the central commercial city of the upper Kohistan District. It has a large population, and all the regional castes can be found there. The Khyber Pakhtunkhwa government officially declared it as a city in 2011. The postal code is 20100.

See also 

 Kohistan District, Pakistan

External links
Khyber-Pakhtunkhwa Government website section on Lower Dir
United Nations
 HAJJ website Uploads
 PBS paiman.jsi.com

Kohistan District, Pakistan
Populated places in Kohistan District, Pakistan
Union councils of Khyber Pakhtunkhwa
Union Councils of Kohistan District, Pakistan